Northeast Ohio Regional Airport , owned and operated by the Ashtabula County Airport Authority, is a public-use airport in Ashtabula County, Ohio, United States, eight nautical miles (15 km) southeast of the central business district of the city of Ashtabula. Airport is located in Denmark Township near the Village of Jefferson, which is the County Seat of Ashtabula County. Located within minutes of Lake Erie and the intersection of major Interstates 90 (East/West) and 11 (North/South), the convenient location of the Northeast Ohio Regional Airport (HZY) makes it the perfect choice for both corporate and private travelers. According to the FAA's National Plan of Integrated Airport Systems for 2009–2013, it is classified as a general aviation airport.

The Northeast Ohio Regional Airport received 7 million dollars in federal funding for an airport improvement project. The project encompassed a runway reconstruction, a 703-foot runway extension, and Runway Safety Area which is compliant to current safety design standards.  The resulting 5,900-foot runway is capable of serving most business and private aircraft.  Northeast Ohio Regional Airport is only the fourth safety compliant airport in Ohio out of 102 public airports.

Although most U.S. airports use the same three-letter location identifier for the FAA and IATA, Northeast Ohio Regional Airport is assigned HZY by the FAA and JFN by the IATA.

The airport received its current name in 2012 and the FAA recognized the name in early 2013.

Facilities and aircraft 
It has one runway designated 9/27 with an grooved asphalt surface measuring 5,900 by 100 feet (1,798 x 30 m).

For the 12-month period ending January 6, 2017, the airport had 16,886 aircraft operations, an average of 46 per day: 96% general aviation, 4% air taxi, and <1% military.

Aircraft & Runway

FAA designated ARC C-II design standard, permitted to serve medium-sized corporate jet aircraft

 Runway 9/27 measures 5,900 feet by 100 feet
 Equipped with High Intensity Runway Lights (HIRLs).
 Runway ends are served by Area Navigation (RNAV) GPS approaches
 Precision Approach Path Indicators (PAPIs)
 Runway End Identifier Lights (REILs).
 Large airport improvement project and runway extension underway  Facilities

Over 31,000 sq. ft in 5 conventional hangars comprising over 31,000 square feet of space

 44 T-hangars
 13 tie-down spaces
 A 27 space auto parking area
 One 10,000 gallon above-ground Jet A fuel tank
 One 3,000 gallon Jet A fuel truck

A de-icing truck for winter service

References

External links 
 Aerial photo as of 20 April 1994 from USGS The National Map
 

Airports in Ohio
Buildings and structures in Ashtabula County, Ohio
Ohio
County government agencies in Ohio
Transportation in Ashtabula County, Ohio